Nehanda Charwe Nyakasikana also known as Mbuya Nehanda ( 1840–1898) was a svikiro, or spirit medium of the Zezuru Shona people. She was a medium of Nehanda, a female Shona mhondoro (a powerful and respected ancestral spirit). As one of the spiritual leaders of the Shona, she was one of the leaders of a revolt, the Chimurenga, against the British South Africa Company's colonisation of what is now Zimbabwe led by Cecil John Rhodes in 1889. She was a Hera of the HwataShava Mufakose Dynasty. She and her ally Sekuru Kaguvi were eventually captured and executed by the company on charges of murder. She has been commemorated by Zimbabweans by statues, songs, novels, and poems, and the names of streets and hospitals. The legacy of the medium continued to be linked to the theme of resistance, particularly the guerrilla war that began in 1972. Her name became of increasing importance to the nationalist movements in Zimbabwe.

History of the spirit Nehanda
The spirit Nehanda is said to be the mhondoro, a royal mudzimu (ancestral spirit) or "lion spirit",that uses women as her mediums. The mediums are given the title Nehanda or Mbuya Nehanda. One of the daughters of Nyatsimba Mutota, the first leader of the Munhumutapa state, was considered to possess this spirit. Mhondoro spirits were revered spirits among the Shona, as it was believed that they could interpret the orders and wishes of Mwari, the senior deity. The original Nehanda was considered to be Nyamhita, the daughter of the first Monomatapa Mutota, who was living in the escarpment north of Guruve in about 1430. Mutota was the founder of the Mutapa state. He had a son called Matope who later became the second Monomatapa. Matope was Nyamhita's younger half brother, and to increase the power of Matope, Mutota ordered his son to sleep with his older half sister, Nyamhita, who became widely known as Nehanda. This incest ritual was believed to have resulted in the increase of Matope's rule and empire. Matope handed over a part of his empire to Nehanda who became so powerful and well known that her spirit lived on in the human bodies of various spirit mediums until almost 500 years later when it was believed to occupy the body of the Mazoe Nehanda. During periods of possession by the spirit, spirit mediums were believed to be speaking with the voice and personality of the original Nehanda and not with their own.

Biography of Nehanda Charwe Nyakasikana 
Charwe Nyakasikana was born in 1840, in what is today called the Chishawasha District located in Central Mashonaland.  She was the daughter of a man named Chitaura, who was the younger son of Shayachimwe. Shayachimwe, founded the Hwata dynasty in the upper Mazowe valley in the late eighteenth century. She married and had two daughters and a son, but the name of her husband is not recalled. Living in the hills around Mazoe, Zimbabwe, in the mid 19th century, were various subchiefs including Chidamba. In Chidamba's village lived Charwe Nyakasikana, who was considered to be the female incarnation of the oracle spirit Nehanda. D. N. Beach suggests that she became possessed by the spirit in 1884.

As medium of the spirit Nehanda, Nyakasikana made oracular pronouncements and performed traditional ceremonies that were thought to ensure rain and good crops. She held great authority even before the 1896-7 rebellion. She was a powerful woman and staunchly committed to upholding traditional Shona culture. In a map drawn by missionaries (c. 1888) displaying work by the Church, there is a village called Nehanda's. Mbuya Nehanda was instrumental in organising the nationwide participation in the First Chimurenga of 1896–7. King Lobengula recognised her as a powerful spiritual medium in the land. During the arrival of the first European settlers, Nehanda Charwe Nyakasikana occupied an important and influential position in the religious hierarchy in Mashonaland, where she is the only recorded woman known to have held such a significant position during the 19th century.

Spirit mediums at first promoted good relations between the Zezuru people and early European settlers. As white settlement increased in the land, according to sources Nehanda initially welcomed them by the pioneers and counseled her followers to be friendly towards them. "Don't be afraid of them," she said, "as they are only traders, but take a black cow to them and say this is the meat with which we greet you." However, relationships became strained when the settlers started imposing taxes on the Matabele and conscripting them for various labor projects. Following the imposition of a "hut tax" and other tax assessments in 1894, both the Ndebele and Shona people revolted in June 1896, in what became known as the First Chimurenga or Second Matabele War. The rebellion, in Mashonaland at least, was encouraged by traditional religious leaders including Nyakasikana. Due to the cultural beliefs of the local people, the leading roles behind the rebellion were three spirit mediums. The rebellion was initiated in Matebeland in May 1896, led by Mukwati. In October 1896 Kaguvi and Nehanda from Mashonaland joined in; these were the three critical people behind the rebellion.

Kaguvi (aka Kagubi) was believed to be the spirit husband of the other great Shona spirit, Nehanda, and it may have been this connection which enabled him to persuade Mbuya Nehanda to preach the gospel of war in Mashonaland, which led to the first Chimurenga. The role as well as the influence of the spirit mediums in form of Kaguvi and Nehanda, cannot be understated. As far as the people were concerned Nehanda and Kaguvi were the voices of God aka 'Mwari'. Kaguvi and later Nehanda (after being convinced by Kaguvi) preached that according to Mwari the cause of all the trouble that had come upon the land was the white man. They had brought the locusts and the rinderpest, and to crown it all the owners of the cattle which had died were not allowed to eat the meat of the carcasses, which had to be burned or buried. Mwari decreed that the white men were to be driven from the country; that the natives had nothing to fear because Mwari would turn the bullets of the white man into water. A public press photograph was taken of Nehanda and Kaguvi in 1897 to display their success.

After the end of the rebellion in 1897, Nyakasikana was captured and charged with the murder of Native Commissioner Henry Hawkins Pollard in 1896. She was found guilty after eyewitnesses claimed that she had ordered an associate to chop Pollard's head off. Consequently, she was hanged in March 1898. Much mythology grew up around the difficulty involved in killing her.

Legacy 
Nehanda's heroism became a significant source of inspiration in the nationalist struggle for liberation in the 1960s and 1970s. Her name is now usually prefixed by the respectful title of Mbuya, or grandmother [a title also given to female spirit mediums & ancestors in African spirituality]. The maternity section of Parirenyatwa Hospital in Harare is named after her. The College of Health Sciences of the University of Zimbabwe is located there as well.

Statue 
In May 2021, a statue of Mbuya Nehanda was unveiled in Zimbabwe's capital city Harare along Julias Nyerere Way, where the road meets Samora Machel Avenue. Zimbabwean sculptor David Guy Mutasa designed the statue of Mbuya Nehanda.

References

Further reading

 Vera, Yvonne (1993). Nehanda. Novel

1840s births
1898 deaths
African resistance to colonialism
African women in war
History of Zimbabwe
People executed by hanging
Shona people
Women in 19th-century warfare
Zimbabwean military personnel
Zimbabwean rebels